Sneads is a town in Jackson County, Florida, United States. The population was 1,849 at the 2010 census. Sneads is governed by a five-member town council and a city manager. It also has an all-volunteer fire rescue department, and its own police force of eight sworn officers: six full-time officers, an Administrative Assistant, and three part-time dispatchers. The largest employer in the Sneads area is the Florida Department of Corrections, which operates Appalachee Correctional Institution, outside the city proper.

Sneads was founded in 1894 and is the fourth largest municipality in Jackson County, following Marianna (the county seat), Graceville and Malone.

Sneads has two schools in the Jackson County School District, Sneads High School and Sneads Elementary . As of 2021, the Sneads High School Girls Varsity Volleyball team have won the last nine FHSAA state 1A championships.

Geography

Demographics

2020 census

As of the 2020 United States census, there were 1,699 people, 866 households, and 559 families residing in the town.

2000 census
As of the census of 2000, there were 1,919 people, 796 households, and 554 families residing in the town. The racial makeup of the town was 79.05% White, 16.78% African American, 0.89% Native American, 0.10% Asian, 1.93% from other races, and 1.25% from two or more races. Hispanic or Latino of any race were 3.34% of the population.

There were 796 households, out of which 31.7% had children under the age of 18 living with them, 50.6% were married couples living together, 13.6% had a female householder with no husband present, and 30.4% were non-families. 27.3% of all households were made up of individuals, and 12.6% had someone living alone who was 65 years of age or older.  The average household size was 2.41 and the average family size was 2.90.

In the town, the population was spread out, with 25.5% under the age of 18, 9.0% from 18 to 24, 26.5% from 25 to 44, 24.5% from 45 to 64, and 14.5% who were 65 years of age or older.  The median age was 37 years. For every 100 females, there were 95.8 males.  For every 100 females age 18 and over, there were 90.9 males.

The median income for a household in the town was $30,690, and the median income for a family was $37,162. Males had a median income of $25,917 versus $23,674 for females. The per capita income for the town was $15,113.  About 11.2% of families and 17.2% of the population were below the poverty line, including 27.1% of those under age 18 and 11.0% of those age 65 or over.

Notes

References

Towns in Jackson County, Florida
Towns in Florida
Populated places on the Chattahoochee River